Following the death of George Shaw James Francis Stephens takes over General Zoology, or Systematic Natural History 
William Elford Leach describes  the fasciated antshrike and the black-throated coucal in his Zoological Miscellany (1814–1817) 
Edward Smith-Stanley publishes Remarks on the birds of Abyssinia in A Voyage to Abyssinia, & Travels into the interior of that country, executed under the orders of the British Government in the years 1809 & 1810 by Henry Salt. He scientifically describes the striped kingfisher and the red-billed oxpecker.
The Linnaean Society of New England founded. Like many such societies it was short-lived. 
Foundation of Natural History Museum at the University of Oslo

Birding and ornithology by year
1814 in science